The ARIA Singles Chart ranks the best-performing singles in Australia. Its data, published by the Australian Recording Industry Association, is based collectively on the weekly physical and digital sales and streams of singles. In 2017, eleven singles claimed the top spot, including Clean Bandit's "Rockabye", which started its peak position in 2016, and Ed Sheeran's "Shape of You", which spent 15 non-consecutive weeks at number one, breaking the long standing record in chart history previously held by ABBA's "Fernando in 1976. Twelve acts, Harry Styles, DJ Khaled, Quavo, Chance the Rapper, Lil Wayne, Luis Fonsi, Daddy Yankee, Sam Smith, Post Malone, 21 Savage, Camila Cabello and Young Thug, reached the top spot for the first time. Pink achieved her ninth number one with "What About Us", and Taylor Swift achieved her fifth number one with "Look What You Made Me Do".

Chart history

Number-one artists

See also
2017 in music
List of number-one albums of 2017 (Australia)
List of top 10 singles in 2017 (Australia)

References

Australia singles
Number-one singles
2017